Borderline Speedway, is a dirt track racing venue in the Australian state of South Australia located in the locality of Glenburnie, South Australia about  east of the city of Mount Gambier. Racing at the speedway generally takes place between November and May.

History
Borderline Speedway was opened on 23 February 1957 with stock car racing supported by local motorbike races. The South East Racing Car Club took over the promotion of the speedway in 1961 and six years later production car racing was introduced as were the Super Modifieds (later known as Sprintcars).

The speedway received its first safety fence in 1970 and the light towers were replaced with a single light tower on the infield. To improve lighting, this was soon joined by a second infield light tower.

The old Super Modifieds were phased out and Sprintcars first hit the track in 1977. The next improvement to the speedway came during the mid-1980s when clay was added to the  track affectionately known as "The Bullring". This unfortunately saw the end of Motorcycle speedway and Sidecar speedway as a regular on the program at Borderline, but two new categories were introduced, the Formula 500's and Street Stocks.

The pit area was expanded in 1985 to accommodate extra vehicles and over $100,000 worth of improvements to the speedway were completed by December 1987.

From 1980, Borderline has been the South Australian venue for the Easter Sprintcar Trail (the other tracks used generally being Victorian tracks Premier Speedway in Warrnambool and the Avalon Raceway in Lara) with some of the biggest names in Australian sprintcar racing taking part including multiple Australian champions Garry Rush, George and Brooke Tatnell (NSW), Max Dumesny and Brett Lacey (Vic), as well as Mount Gambier's own Bill Barrows (the current President of the speedway), David Veal and Steven Lines.

Borderline Speedway was awarded the Australian Sprintcar Championship in 1995, the first time the title had been held in South Australia outside of the state capital Adelaide. The event was a huge success with a crowd of just on 7,500 witnessing Sydney's Garry Brazier retaining his national crown from Brooke Tatnell and 10-time champion Garry Rush. The success of the event saw the introduction of the Kings Challenge which has become an annual event on the Australian calendar since 1995. Traditionally run on the Friday night before the Grand Annual Sprintcar Classic in Warrnambool, the $10,000 to win event was moved to the Thursday night to accommodate the Classic's move to a 3-day event in 2014. With the Kings Challenge running prior to the Classic, the event attracts the best sprintcar drivers from Australia and the United States.

In 2007, Borderline Speedway celebrated its 50th year of continuous operation.

Borderline is also a regular stop for the World Series Sprintcars, and is run as the 3rd meeting of "Speedweek" during the series following Speedway City in Adelaide, Murray Bridge Speedway, and followed by Avalon Raceway and Premier Speedway. The speedway is also a regular venue for the National Super Sedan Series as well as the Sidecar Grand Slam series. Prior to the series demise in 2000, Borderline also hosted rounds of David Tapp's Australian Speedway Masters Series which saw some of Australia's best Solo riders such as Jason Crump, Leigh Adams, Craig Boyce and Ryan Sullivan take on the world's best including World Champions Sam Ermolenko, Billy Hamill and Greg Hancock (USA), Tony Rickardsson (Sweden), Mark Loram, Simon Wigg and Kelvin Tatum (England).

Since hosting the national sprintcar title in 1995, Borderline has also hosted the Australian Super Sedan Championship, Australian Street Stock Championship, Australian Modified Production Car Championship, Australian Late Model Championship, and in 2007 hosted the 5th and final round of the Australian Solo Championship. The event (and the championship) was won by Australia's reigning Speedway World Champion Jason Crump.

Track information
Length  -  , 1 metre out from the pole line
Width  -  15 metres
Banking  -  1.4 metres
Surface  -  Clay
Safety Fence  -  1.2 metre concrete wall with 1.5 metre high weld-mesh topped with 1.6 metre chain mesh above with 1 metre at 45 degree angle to infield with cable attached
Spectator Fence  -  2.4 metres high cyclone mesh - 3.6 metres beyond catch fence
Noise Level  -  95dba. Effective mufflers are enforced.

Lap records
as of 26 December 2015

Cars
410 Sprintcars: 10.642 - Jamie Veal, 28 December 2014
Formula 500: 13.10 - Brock Hallett, 28 March 2009
Speedcars: 13.30 - Steven Graham, 21 November 1998
Hot rod: 13.67 - Damian Eve, 2 January 1998
Super Sedans: 13.47 - Dave Gartner, 21 March 2015
V8 Dirt Modified: 14.09 - Glen Goonan, 20 November 2004
V6 Sprints: 14.76 - Steven Agars, 12 December 1998
Super Rods: 14.81 - Greg Cocayn, 2 February 2000
Wingless Sprints: 14.81 - Todd Wigzell, 9 January 2010
Sportsmans: 15.20 - Barry Ross, 22 April 2000
Modified Productions: 15.52 - Greg Gartner, 26 February 2000
AMCA Nationals: 16.17 - Brain Chadwick, 20 November 1999
Street Stocks: 16.43 - Jason Duell, 22 February 2003
Junior Sedans: 17.80 - Steven Lines, 20 November 1999

Bikes
(4 laps clutch start)
Solos: 58.60 - Billy Hamill, 15 January 2000
Sidecars: 1:02.01 - Mark Plaisted / Sam Gilbert, 12 January 2013

References

External links
Borderline Speedway official site

Speedway venues in Australia
Motorsport venues in South Australia
Limestone Coast